The Barlow Memorial Medal was created in 1916 by the Canadian Institute of Mining, Metallurgy and Petroleum to recognize the best paper on economic geology published by the Institute each year.

Initially a cash prize, the award then became a silver medal (supplemented by a cash prize), upgrading in 1941 to a gold medal.

The medal is named after Alfred Ernest Barlow, who served as President of the Institute between 1912 and 1919.

Recent Prizewinners
Source:(2006-) Canadian Institute of Mining, Metallurgy and Petroleum
Source (1926-2000): Literary Awards

See also

 List of geology awards

References

External links
 Canadian Institute of Mining, Metallurgy and Petroleum

Canadian science and technology awards
Geology awards
Canadian Institute of Mining, Metallurgy and Petroleum
Awards established in 1916